Gordon was formerly (1975–96) was one of five local government districts in
the Grampian region of Scotland.

The district was formed by the Local Government (Scotland) Act 1973 from part of the former county of Aberdeenshire, namely:

The burghs of:
Ellon
Huntly
Inverurie
Kintore
Oldmeldrum
The districts of Garioch and Huntly
part of the Aberdeen district

The district was abolished in 1996 by the Local Government etc. (Scotland) Act 1994, with its area being included in the unitary Aberdeenshire council area.

Coat of arms
The Gordon District Council was granted a coat of arms by Lord Lyon King of Arms on 9 June 1986. The first quarter of the shield showed three gold boars' heads on a blue ground, the arms of the Gordon family, from whom the district's name was derived. The Gordon arms had formed one quarter of the arms of Aberdeenshire County Council. Boars' heads also formed part of the arms of the burgh of Huntly. The second quarter was derived from the Kintore burgh arms, showing an oak tree. The third quarter was based on the arms of the burgh of Oldmeldrum and the fourth on those of the burgh of Ellon. In the centre of the shield was a gold tower, from Inverurie's burgh arms. Above the arms was a coronet consisting of a gold circlet topped by thistle-heads: a design reserved by Lord Lyon for the arms of district councils.

See also
Gordon (Scottish Parliament constituency)
Clan Gordon
Gordon Highlanders, an infantry regiment
Subdivisions of Scotland

References

 
Districts of Scotland
Politics of Aberdeenshire